The Iraqi Security Forces (ISF) is a term used by the United States Department of Defense (DoD) to describe law enforcement and military forces of the federal government of the Republic of Iraq. During the Iraq War, these entities received training and instruction from the U.S. 101st Airborne Division and the 82nd Airborne Division.

According to Iraq's constitution, the Peshmerga is responsible for general security and stability in the Kurdistan Region of Iraq.

Composition 
The ISF consists of the following agencies and departments:

Ministry of Defense
Iraqi Armed Forces: 
 Iraqi Army
 Iraqi Navy
 Iraqi Air Force
 Ministry of Interior: 
 Iraqi Police
 Facilities Protection Service
 Department of Border Enforcement
 Popular Mobilization Forces
 Peshmerga

See also 

 Law enforcement in Iraq

References

External links 
 Ministry of Defense
 Ministry of Interior

Government of Iraq